Oaklands is a historic home located in West Whiteland Township, Chester County, Pennsylvania. The original house was built in 1772, and is a two-story, three-bay rectangular stone structure.  It has a major wing to the east, with an addition to that wing.  The front of the wing has a two-story front porch with decorative iron supports.  Also on the property is a contributing 1/1/2-story stuccoed stone gatehouse, remodeled in 1900 as a private school for the Thomas children.

It was listed on the National Register of Historic Places in 1984.

References

Houses on the National Register of Historic Places in Pennsylvania
Houses completed in 1772
Houses in Chester County, Pennsylvania
National Register of Historic Places in Chester County, Pennsylvania
1772 establishments in Pennsylvania